No. 502 (Ulster) Squadron was a Royal Auxiliary Air Force squadron that saw service in World War II. It was reformed in September 2013, and is the oldest of all the reserve squadrons, being formed in 1925.

History

Formation and early years
No. 502 squadron was originally formed on 15 May 1925 as No. 502 (Bomber) Squadron, a Special Reserve squadron at RAF Aldergrove, and it was composed of a mixture of regular and reserve personnel. On 1 December 1925 the name No. 502 (Ulster) Squadron was adopted. The squadron operated in the heavy night bomber role and as such it was initially equipped with Vickers Vimys from June 1925, re-equipping with Handley Page Hyderabads in July 1928. Vickers Virginias arrived in December 1931, but in October 1935 the squadron was transferred to the day bomber role for which it received Westland Wallaces, Hawker Hinds arriving in April 1937. Shortly after this, on 1 July 1937, it was transferred to the Auxiliary Air Force, the Special Reserve being disbanded.

In Coastal Command

On 28 November 1938, No. 502 (Ulster) Squadron became part of RAF Coastal Command, and was re-equipped with Avro Ansons in January 1939.  When war broke out, the squadron was used to fly patrols in the Atlantic off the Irish Coast.  From October 1940, the Squadron flew with Armstrong Whitworth Whitleys.  It was reported that on 30 November 1941 the squadron became the first Coastal Command unit to make a successful attack on a U-boat with air-to-surface radar, sinking U-Boat U-206 in the Bay of Biscay. This report has been countered with newer information that the U-206 was more probably sunk by the minefield, "Beech," laid there by the British after August 1940, and that the squadron's attack was actually on U-71, which escaped without loss.

In January 1942 the squadron officially moved to both Norfolk (RAF Docking) and Cornwall, where a maintenance station was set up at RAF St Eval.  Until 1944 the squadron's main role was to carry anti-submarine patrols.  In January 1943 conversion to Halifax GR.Mk.IIs began, the first patrol by this type being flown on 12 March.  In addition to anti-submarine patrols, now also attacks on enemy shipping off the French coast were made.  In September 1944 with the French coast back in Allied hands, the squadron moved to Scotland at RAF Stornoway to carry out attacks on German shipping off the Norwegian coast, remaining there until the end of the war.  It was disbanded on 25 May 1945.

Into the jet age
With the reactivation of the Auxiliary Air Force, No. 502 was reformed on 10 May 1946, again at RAF Aldergrove, but now as a light bomber squadron, equipped with Mosquito B.25s from July 1946.  In December night fighter Mosquitoes replaced the bombers, but in June 1948 the units of the by now Royal Auxiliary Air Force all converted to the day fighter role, 502 receiving Spitfire F.22s for the purpose. Jet conversion began in January 1951 with the arrival of Vampire FB.5s, which were supplemented by FB.9s in July 1954. The squadron continued to fly both types until, along with all the flying units of the RAuxAF, it was disbanded on 10 March 1957.

Reformation at Aldergrove
It was confirmed in September 2013 that No. 502 (Ulster) Squadron has reformed at Aldergrove Flying Station. As a general Squadron its mission is to provide fully trained Royal Auxiliary Air Force personnel, across a wide spectrum of roles, to support current and future worldwide commitments. No. 502 is the oldest of the reserve squadrons, having been formed in 1925, and in 2019, a new standard was awarded to the squadron as the old standard had been awarded in 1939 and was worn out.

Aircraft operated

Squadron bases

Commanding officers

Notable personnel
Clive Beadon
John Burrough (rower), killed 26 November 1944.
William Maxfield (cyclist), killed 27 December 1943.
Michael Oser Weizmann, son of Chaim Weizmann, who was shot down and reported missing in 1942.

References

Notes

Bibliography

 
 
 
 . (New edition in 1992 by Crécy Publishing, .)
  (second edition 2001)
  (new edition 1976)
 
  (new edition 1976, reprinted 1978)

External links

 502 Squadron history on RAF site
 World War II bases at RAF Commands
 History of No.'s 500–520 Squadrons at RAF Web
 No. 502 Squadron aircraft and markings at RAF Web
 Ulster Aviation Society

502
Aircraft squadrons of the Royal Air Force in World War II
Military units and formations established in 1925
Military units and formations disestablished in 1945
Military units and formations established in 1946
Military units and formations disestablished in 1957
Military of Northern Ireland
Military history of Northern Ireland
1925 establishments in the United Kingdom